Michael O'Reilly (born 30 March 1993) is an Irish amateur boxer from Portlaoise.

Career
O'Reilly is part of Portlaoise Boxing Club. He competes at middleweight. O'Reilly's first major international tournament was the 2015 European Games in Baku, where he won the gold medal by beating local favourite Xaybula Musalov in the final.  That qualified O'Reilly for the 2015 AIBA World Boxing Championships where he won bronze.

In 2016, O'Reilly qualified to represent Ireland for the Rio Olympics at the AIBA World Olympic Qualifying Tournament in Baku. On 4 August 2016, on the eve of the Olympics Opening Ceremony, O'Reilly was suspended after a sample provided prior to his travel to Rio tested positive for a banned substance.
On 9 August O'Reilly released a statement in which he admitted unintentionally taking a banned supplement prior to the Games.

References

1993 births
Living people
AIBA World Boxing Championships medalists
Boxers at the 2015 European Games
European Games medalists in boxing
European Games gold medalists for Ireland
Doping cases in boxing
Irish sportspeople in doping cases
Irish male boxers
Sportspeople from County Laois
Middleweight boxers